Willemsoord is a village in the Dutch provinces of Overijssel and Friesland. For the most part it lays within in the municipality Steenwijkerland, and small part lays within the municipality of Weststellingwerf. It was founded in 1820 as an orphanage and colony of the Society of Humanitarianism.

A settlement developed around the colony. In 1840, it was home to 925 people. In 1851, a church was built. In 1923, the Society was disbanded and its possessions were sold. In 1942, the national repository of art was built near Willemsoord. It housed over 3,000 art pieces in a bomb resistant bunker-like building.

Gallery

References 

Steenwijkerland
Geography of Weststellingwerf
Populated places in Overijssel
Populated places in Friesland
1820 establishments in the Netherlands